The Nambung River is a river in the Wheatbelt region of Western Australia,  north of Perth. The river drains an area between the towns of Cervantes and Badgingarra. In its lower reaches the Nambung River forms a chain of waterholes in the Nambung Wetlands where it disappears underground into a limestone karst system  from the Indian Ocean.

History
The Nambung River was encountered by explorer George Grey on 16 April 1839, during his second disastrous expedition along the Western Australian coast. He named it the Smith River after Frederick Smith, a member of his party who died from exhaustion during the final days of the expedition. Smith was the 18-year-old grandson of William Smith, prominent M.P. for Norwich, and was a first cousin to Florence Nightingale.  
It was renamed the Nambung River by government surveyor John Sherlock Brooking in 1874-75. The Nambung River's longest tributary was subsequently named Frederick Smith Creek.

The  river  was  recorded  as  the Namban in 1875 by  Staff-Commander William Edwin Archdeacon R.N., who was in charge of 
the  Admiralty  survey of the coast of  Western  Australia. It was described as such in the description of the Dongara to Perth stock route in 1889. The spelling Nambung was in general use from at least 1888, the name  being derived  from  an  Aboriginal  word  possibly  meaning crooked or winding.

Geography
The Nambung River catchment area is bounded by those of the Hill River (to the north) and Mullering Brook (to the east and south). Its main tributaries are Bibby Creek, Mount Jetty Creek and Frederick Smith Creek. The river terminates at the surface in limestone karst terrain 9 km south-south-east of Cervantes,  from the Indian Ocean coast. The river makes a chain of waterholes before it disappears into a cave system. Water eventually seeps out along the coastline.
The Pinnacles, within the Nambung National Park, lie within the southern part of the Nambung River catchment. The surrounding area is subject to the Nambung National Park Management Plan.

Geohydrology
The Nambung River flows underground into a karst system bounding the eastern edge of the Nambung Wetlands, within Nambung National Park. Features associated with the wetlands include salt lakes, swamps, lagoons and dunal damplands. Most lagoons and lakelets in the area are isolated from the sea and from surface creek drainage, being fed by rainfall and groundwater flow from surrounding dunes and limestone.
When the backplain to the wetlands floods, waters are filtered into a karst aquifer and into the sea via underground channels. As a consequence of the percolation of surface water through the limestone substrate, the catchment boundaries of main drainage lines become undefined over the limestone topography.

Salinity and geology
The Nambung River and Wetland have variable salinity that can be independent of surface activities. Groundwater salinity is highest at discharge boundaries formed by salt lakes, and in the lower catchment area of the river where there is saline groundwater discharge from the Jurassic Eneabba Formation and Cattamarra Coal Measures. The upward discharge of brackish groundwater from Mesozoic aquifers into superficial formations causes the salinity of the groundwater in the superficial formations locally to exceed 8,000 mg/L TDS on the Nambung River flats east of Cervantes.

Karst terrain
The superficial formations and Mesozoic formations discharge large volumes of groundwater to the sea. Much of this discharge flows through karstic solution channels in the Tamala limestone, a calcareous and siliceous formation deposited in the middle to late Pleistocene (1,500,000-10,000  years  ago). Many karst features of the Tamala Limestone, the result of karst processes and include subterranean drainage through caverns and tunnels, dolines and sinkholes, residual cone hills and circular depressions, limestone pillars and root concretions, can be linked directly to the Nambung River. Caves have evolved in relation to the movement of weakly acidic water groundwater that gradually dissolves calcium carbonate in the limestone, which can be locally redeposited within caves and cavities.

References

Rivers of the Wheatbelt region